Villa di Briano is a comune (municipality) in the Province of Caserta in the Italian region Campania, located about  northwest of Naples and about  southwest of Caserta.

Villa di Briano borders the following municipalities: Casal di Principe, Casapesenna, Frignano, San Cipriano d'Aversa, San Marcellino, San Tammaro.

History 
In the past, the town was known by the name Frignano Minore (Piccolo), until in 1950, November the 17th, it was renamed Villa Di Briano. This name comes from the Latin 'vallis' (valley) and from 'Ambriano' that became Mbriano and then Briano.

Main sights 
Villa di Briano is famous for the ancient church of Maria Santissima di Briano located in a large area of open land. Here, the Madonna di Briano is celebrated with an annual festival held on the Sunday after Easter. During this festivity believers come from all over the region. There are colourful floats, dances and famous folk songs. Furthermore, the day after Easter people have fun listening to the "vattienti", dancing frantically with them.

References

Cities and towns in Campania